Gustavo Ramos may refer to:

 Gustavo Ramos Hernández (born 1974), Mexican equestrian
 Gustavo Ramos (artist) (born 1993), Brazilian-American fine artist and oil painter
 Gustavo Ramos (footballer) (born 1996), Brazilian footballer